The 1977 Rugby League World Cup involved players from the national rugby league football teams of four countries: Australia, France, Great Britain and New Zealand.

Australia
Coach:  Terry Fearnley
Graham Eadie
Allan McMahon
Mick Cronin
Russel Gartner
Mark Harris
Mark Thomas
Terry Fahey
John Peard
John Kolc
Greg Veivers
Nick Geiger
Terry Randall
Arthur Beetson (C)
Ray Higgs
Greg Pierce
Rod Reddy
Denis Fitzgerald
Tom Raudonikis

France
Coach:  Yves Bégou
Guy Alard (Carcassonne)
Christian Baile (Carcassonne)
Hervé Bonet (Saint-Estève)
Jean-Marc Bourret (XIII Catalan)
Jean-Louis Brial (XIII Catalan)
José Calle (Saint-Estève) (C)
Manuel Caravaca (Carcassonne)
Michel Cassin (Toulouse)
Max Chantal (Villeneuve)
Patrick Chauvet (Carcassonne)
Jean-Jacques Cologni (XIII Catalan)
Henri Daniel (XIII Catalan)
Guy Garcia (Carcassonne)
Jacques Guigue (Avignon)
Christian Laskawiec (Albi)
Gérard Lépine (Bordeaux)
Jackie Imbert (Avignon)
Jean-Marie Imbert (Avignon)
Jean-Claude Mayorgas (Toulouse)
Michel Moussard (Albi)
José Moya (Carcassonne)
Guy Rodriguez (Toulouse)
Joël Roosebrouck (Villeneuve)
André Ruiz (Carcassonne)
Pierre Saboureau (XIII Catalan)
Jean-Paul Sauret (XIII Catalan)
René Terrats (Saint-Estève)

Great Britain
Coach:  David Watkins
George Fairbairn
Stuart Wright
John Holmes
Les Dyl
Keith Fielding
Bill Francis
Roger Millward (C)
Steve Nash
David Ward
George Nicholls
Jimmy Thompson
Keith Elwell
Steve Pitchford
Len Casey
Eddie Bowman
Phil Hogan
Ken Gill
Peter Smith

New Zealand
Coach:  Ron Ackland
Warren Collicoat
Michael O'Donnell
Dane O'Hara
Olsen Filipaina
Chris Jordan
Kevin Fisher
Dennis Williams
John Smith
Whetu Henry
Fred Ah Kuoi
Alan Rushton
Dane Sorensen
Lyndsay Proctor
Kurt Sorensen
Tony Coll (C)
Whare Henry
John Whittaker
Mark Graham
Ray Baxendale

External links
World Cup 1977 at Rugby League Project

1977 in rugby league
Rugby League World Cup squads